Dunmora is a rural locality in the Fraser Coast Region, Queensland, Australia.

References

Further reading 

  —includes information on other schools: Braemar, Woocoo, Teebar East, Teebar West, Boompa, Idahlia, Dunmora, Musket Flat, Bowling Green, Aramara North, Aramara, and Gungaloon.

Fraser Coast Region
Localities in Queensland